The municipalities of East Timor are divided into 65 administrative posts (former subdistricts). Each administrative post is divided into several sucos. Sucos are divided into several aldeias, the smallest political division of East Timor.

List

See also 
Municipalities of East Timor
Sucos of East Timor

References

 
East Timor, Administrative posts
East Timor 2
Administrative posts, East Timor
East Timor geography-related lists

de:Liste der Verwaltungseinheiten Osttimors